BTM2 (also known as Behind the Music II: Road to Fame or Behind the Music 2) was a weekly documentary which focused on the personal lives of musicians. The show ran February 15, 2000 – June 13, 2000 with a total of one season with 12 produced episodes.

Cast and Crew
 Michael McNamara – Director
 Ambrose Smith – Narration
 Mary J. Blige – Interviewee
 Dr. Dre – Interviewee
 Method Man – Interviewee
 Mark Rowland – Writer
 Michael McNamara – Writer
 George Moll – Executive Producer
 Jeff Gaspin – Executive Producer
 Michael McNamara – Producer
 Alex Castino – Associate Producer
 Linda Gonzalez – Associate Producer
 Sheri Spanish – Segment Producer

References

2000 American television series debuts
2000 American television series endings
2000s American documentary television series
English-language television shows
Pop music television series
Rock music television series